Nura, is a village in the Yrgyz District, Aktobe Region, Kazakhstan. It is the head of the Nura Rural District (KATO code - 156843100). Population:

Geography

See also
Lakes of the lower Turgay and Irgiz

References

Populated places in Aktobe Region